This is a list of national swimming records for Colombia. These are the fastest times ever swum by a Colombian swimmer, which are recognised and ratified by the Federación Colombiana de Natación (FECNA).

All records were set in finals unless noted otherwise.

Long Course (50 m)

Men

Women

Mixed relay

Short Course (25 m)

Men

Women

Mixed relay

Notes

References
General
Columbian Long Course Records 2 November 2022 updated
Specific

External links
FECNA web site

Colombia
Records
Swimming
Swimming